Sabina Ćudić  (born 1982) is a Bosnian politician who is vice-president of socio-liberal political party Naša stranka, Member of the House of Representatives of Parliament of the Federation of Bosnia and Herzegovina.

Biography
Sabina Ćudić was born in Sarajevo. She was candidate for the Novo Sarajevo municipality mayor in 2012.

Sources
  Naša stranka 
  Sarajevo Canton Assembly 

Living people
Bosnia and Herzegovina politicians
1982 births